Hardraw Force is a waterfall on Hardraw Beck in Hardraw Scar, a wooded ravine just outside the hamlet of Hardraw,  north of the town of Hawes, Wensleydale, in the Yorkshire Dales.  The Pennine Way long distance footpath passes close by.

Geologically the bed of the river and plunge pool is shale; on top of that is sandstone and the top layer is carboniferous limestone.

It is on private land but public access to the falls is available through a turnstile behind the Green Dragon Inn. The current cost is £4 per adult, £2.50 per child.  Access behind the falls is now prohibited.

Hardraw Scar 

Hardraw Scar is a limestone gorge behind the Green Dragon inn at Hardraw near Hawes in the Yorkshire Dales. It is a natural amphitheatre and in September is the site of an annual brass-band contest. The contest attracts bands from all over the North of England and is a popular event amongst players and audiences alike.

The gorge is alongside the Pennine Way. Access to the gorge is via the nearby public house.

In 1899 a great flood came racing over the waterfall and into Hardraw itself, ruining buildings and uprooting coffins from the graveyard. The lip of the waterfall was demolished by the force of the water and the landowner at the time (Lord Wharncliffe) got his estate manager to repair the lip and it is now held together at the top by metal stakes.

Hardraw Force and popular culture 

Both J. M. W. Turner and William Wordsworth visited the waterfall and both men stayed at the Green Dragon Inn.

The falls were used as a location in the film Robin Hood: Prince of Thieves, in the scene where Maid Marian catches Robin Hood bathing under a waterfall.

Hardraw Force is the setting for a brass-band competition held annually on the second Sunday in September. The competition was first held in the natural amphitheatre of the falls in 1884 when six bands took part; the competition lapsed in 1927 but was revived in 1976 and has gone from strength to strength since.  In recent years two other musical events have started up at the falls: the Hawdraw Bash is a folk-rock concert in early July and the Hardraw Gathering is a three-day festival of traditional music at the end of July.

Notes

References

External links

Website
Video footage of the beck, gill and force

Canyons and gorges of England
Waterfalls of North Yorkshire
Wensleydale